Alfred North may refer to:

 Alfred John North (1855–1917), ornithologist
 Alfred North (water polo) (1906–1988), British water polo player
 Alfred North (jurist) (1900–1981), President of the Court of Appeal of New Zealand

See also
Alfred North Whitehead (1861–1947), mathematician